Nick Stone may refer to:
Nick Stone (author), British thriller writer
Nick Stone (footballer, born 1981), Australian rules footballer, played with Hawthorn & St Kilda between 2002 and 2005
Nick Stone (footballer, born 1972), Australian rules footballer, played with West Coast between 1997 and 2000
Nick Stone (screenwriter), see Alien Intruder

See also
Nicholas Stone (1586/87–1647), English sculptor and architect